Gautschi is a surname. Notable people with the surname include:

Daphne Gautschi (born 2000), Swiss handball player
Georges Gautschi (1904–1985), Swiss figure skater
Rolf Gautschi, Swiss curler
Walter Gautschi (born 1927), Swiss-American mathematician